Victory is a political party in Guatemala.

History
The party was established in 2008. It contested the 2011 general elections, although it did not nominate a presidential candidate. In the Congressional elections the party received 1.6% of the vote, winning one of the 158 seats. Prior to the 2015 elections it joined an alliance with Todos and the Unionist Party.

Electoral results

Presidential elections

Legislative elections

References

2008 establishments in Guatemala
Political parties established in 2008
Political parties in Guatemala
Protestantism in Guatemala
Protestant political parties
Conservative parties in Guatemala